In computational complexity theory, BPL (Bounded-error Probabilistic Logarithmic-space), sometimes called BPLP (Bounded-error Probabilistic Logarithmic-space Polynomial-time), is the complexity class of problems solvable in logarithmic space and polynomial time with probabilistic Turing machines with two-sided error. It is named in analogy with BPP, which is similar but has no logarithmic space restriction.

Error model
The probabilistic Turing machines in the definition of BPL may only accept or reject incorrectly less than 1/3 of the time; this is called two-sided error. The constant 1/3 is arbitrary; any x with 0 ≤ x < 1/2 would suffice. This error can be made 2−p(x) times smaller for any polynomial p(x) without using more than polynomial time or logarithmic space by running the algorithm repeatedly.

Related classes
Since two-sided error is more general than one-sided error, RL and its complement co-RL are contained in BPL. BPL is also contained in PL, which is similar except that the error bound is 1/2, instead of a constant less than 1/2; like the class PP, the class PL is less practical because it may require a large number of rounds to reduce the error probability to a small constant.

 showed the weak derandomization result that BPL is contained in SC. SC is the class of problems solvable in polynomial time and polylogarithmic space on a deterministic Turing machine; in other words, this result shows that, given polylogarithmic space, a deterministic machine can simulate logarithmic space probabilistic algorithms.

BPL is contained in NC and in L/poly. Saks and Zhou showed that BPL is contained in DSPACE(log3/2 n), and in 2021 Hoza improved this to show BPL is contained in  DSPACE 
.

References 

Probabilistic complexity classes